Evarcha grandis is a jumping spider that lives in Nigeria.

References

Endemic fauna of Nigeria
Salticidae
Spiders described in 2011
Spiders of Africa
Fauna of Nigeria